The Roosevelt Hotel may refer to:

The Hollywood Roosevelt Hotel
Hotel Roosevelt (Cedar Rapids, Iowa)
The Roosevelt Hotel New Orleans
The Roosevelt Hotel (New York)
Roosevelt Hotel (Portland, Oregon)

See also
Hotel Roosevelt, now The Carling, in Jacksonville, Florida
Hotel Roosevelt fire, Jacksonville